Jacques-Antoine Révéroni, baron de Saint-Cyr (5  May 1767, Lyon – 19 March 1829, Paris) was a French soldier and man of letters.

Révéroni de Saint-Cyr is remembered mostly for his novel, Pauliska, ou La Perversité moderne, mémoires récents d'une Polonaise, (1798), first published by bibliophile Jacob in 1848, after the author's manuscript.

Theatre 
1793: Le Club de sans-souci, ou les Deux Pupilles, comedy in one act and free verse, mingled with vaudevilles, in-8°.
1795: Helena, ou les Miquelets, opera in 2 acts, Paris, in-8°.
1795: Élisa, ou le Voyage au mont Saint-Bernard, opera in two acts, in-8°.
1797: L’Hospice de village, opéra, en 2 acts.
1800: Le Délire, ou les Suites d’une erreur, one-act opéra comique, in-8°).
 La Rencontre aux bains, one-act comédie en vaudeville.
1804: Sophie Pierrefeu, ou le Désastre de Messine, historical fact in 3 acts, mingled with ariettes, in-8° (unplayed).
1805: Le Vaisseau amiral, ou Forbin et Delville, one-act opera, in-8°.
1807: Lina ou le Mystère, drame lyrique in three acts and in prose, music by Nicolas Dalayrac, created at the Opéra-Comique (théâtre Feydeau), 8 October, in-8°.
1810: Cagliostro, ou les Illuminés, opéra comique in 3 acts, in-8°.
1811: Les Ménestrels, ou la Tour d’Amboise, opéra in 3 acts, in-8°.
1816: Christine, reine de Suède, tragedy in 3 acts, in-8° (unplayed).
1816: Déjanire, ou la Mort d’Hercule, grand opéra in one act, in-8° (unplayed).
1816: Pline, ou l’Héroïsme des arts et de l’amitié, opera in one act, in-8° (unplayed).
1817: Mademoiselle de Lespinasse, comedy in one acta and in verse, in-8° (unplayed).
1817: Les Partis, ou le Cornérage universel, comedy in 3 acts and in verse, in-8° (unplayed).
1817: Le Siège de Rhodes, opera in 3 acts, in-8° (unplayed).
1817: Le Sybarite, comedy in 3 acts and in verse, in-8° (unplayed).
1818: La Comtesse de la Marck, historical comedy in trois acts, (with Armand d'Artois).
1827: Vauban à Charleroi, historical comedy in 3 acts and in verse, in-8° (with Vial) (Many of these pieces were not presented; others were played in theaters Louvois, Favart, Montansier, Feydeau, de la Cité et de l’Odéon. In 1828, Révéroni de Saint-Cyr composed an opéra comique entitled les Grenouilles, imitated from Aristophanes, and he had chosen midnight to read it to the Feydeau theater committee. Having found no one, he got angry and knocked at the door of some actors. It was the beginning of an insanity which only got worse.)

Novels 
1797: Sabina d’Herfeld, ou les Dangers de l’imagination, Paris, 2 vol. in-12 ; 4th edition, 1814, 2 vol. in-12.
1798: Pauliska, ou La Perversité moderne, mémoires récents d’une Polonaise, 2 vol. in-12.
1799: Nos Folies, ou Mémoires d’un Musulman connu à Paris, 2 vol. in-12.
1813: La Princesse de Nevers, ou Mémoires du sire de la Touraille, 2 vol. in-12 ; 2nd edit. 1823, 2 vol. in-12.
1814: L’Officier russe à Paris, ou Aventures et réflexions critiques du comte de ***, 2 vol. in-12.
1818: Le Torrent des passions, ou les Dangers de la galanterie,  2 vol. in-12.
1822: Historiettes galantes et grivoises, suivies des Mœurs du jour, Fables politiques et critiques, in-12.
1823: Le Prince Raymond de Bourbon, ou les Passions après les révolutions, suite de la Princesse de Nevers, 2 vol. in-12.
1825: Taméha, reine des îles Sandwich, 2 vol. in-12

Scientific books 
1795: Inventions militaires et fortifiantes, ou Essais sur des moyens nouveaux offensifs et cachés dans la guerre défensive, Paris, in-8°, with 4 pl. ; 2nd edition, under the title Inventions militaires dans la guerre défensive, 1798, in-12.
1804: Essai sur le perfectionnement des beaux-arts par les sciences exactes, ou Calculs et hypothèses sur la poésie, la peinture et la musique, Paris, 1804, 2 vol. in-8°, avec 4 pl.
1808: Essai sur le mécanisme de la guerre, in-8°. Encouraged by Carnot, the author reworked entirely his book and gave latter another edition under the title Statique de la guerre, or Principes de stratégie et de tactique, followed by Mémoires militaires et inédits, et la plupart anecdotiques, relatifs à des généraux ou des événements célèbres, à Bonaparte, à Dumouriez, au plan de la défense des Tuileries, le 10 août, au 13 vendémiaire, etc., Paris, 1826, in-8°, with planches.
 1820: Examen critique de l’équilibre social européen, ou Abrégé de statistique politique et littéraire, in-8°, with planche et tableaux.

An undated Ode à S. M. l’empereur Alexandre is attributed to Révéroni de Saint-Cyr. Presque tous ses ouvrages ont paru sans nom d’auteur.

Sources 
 Louis-Gabriel Michaud, Biographie universelle, ancienne et moderne, Paris, (p. 1846)

External links 
 Œuvres de Révéroni de Saint-Cyr on Gallica.

18th-century French writers
18th-century French male writers
18th-century French dramatists and playwrights
19th-century French dramatists and playwrights
1767 births
1829 deaths
Barons of the First French Empire
Officiers of the Légion d'honneur
Knights of the Order of Saint Louis